Kazi Morshed (24 April 1950 – 3 October 2014) was a Bangladeshi film director. He won Bangladesh National Film Award for Best Director for his film Ghani (2006).

Career
Morshed started working as an assistant director in the 1970s. Later he joined Bangladesh Betar as a program producer. He returned to the film industry under the guidance of the filmmaker Amjad Hossain.

Awards
 Shantona (1991) : Bangladesh National Film Award for Best Screenplay 
 Ghani (2006) :
 Bangladesh National Film Award for Best Film
 Bangladesh National Film Award for Best Director
 Bangladesh National Film Award for Best Story
 Bangladesh National Film Award for Best Screenplay
 Bangladesh National Film Award for Best Dialogue

References

External links

1950 births
2014 deaths
People from Mirsharai Upazila
Bangladeshi film directors
Best Director National Film Award (Bangladesh) winners
Best Screenplay National Film Award (Bangladesh) winners
Best Dialogue National Film Award (Bangladesh) winners
Best Story National Film Award (Bangladesh) winners